Mason Adams (born Mason Abrams; February 26, 1919 – April 26, 2005) was an American character actor and voiceover artist.  From the late 1940s until the early 1970s, he was heard in numerous radio programs and voiceovers for countless television commercials, the latter of which he resumed in the 1980s and 1990s.  In the early '70s, he moved into acting and from 1977 to 1983 held perhaps his best-known role, that of Managing Editor Charlie Hume on Lou Grant.  He also acted in numerous other television and movie roles, most prominently Omen III: The Final Conflict (1981) and F/X (1986).

Early life
Adams was born in Brooklyn, New York, and grew up in Sheepshead Bay. His father, Morris, was an immigrant from Russia and the owner of a company that made machinery and factory tools. His mother, the former Freda Sugarman, was also an immigrant from Russia. He studied at the University of Wisconsin, earning a bachelor’s degree in theater and speech in 1940, and a master’s degree in theater arts in 1941. He later studied acting at New York City's Neighborhood Playhouse School of the Theatre, where he also taught speech. He made his stage debut in 1940, appearing in summer stock at Baltimore's Hilltop Theater.

Career
Adams was heard on many radio programs during Radio's Golden Age. A notable recurring role of his was that of Pepper Young in Pepper Young's Family, which aired from 1947 to 1959. He also portrayed the deadly Nazi Atom Man in a classic 1945 serial on the radio version of The Adventures of Superman.

During the '60s, Adams was ubiquitous as a voiceover actor in television commercials for foods and household products, most notably for Chiffon margarine, Crest toothpaste ("Helps stop cavities before they start") and French's food products (French's Mustard was "the best thing that happened since man first bit dog").  He also did the vocal part of the television commercials for Smucker's preserves ("With a name like Smucker's, it has to be good!"), a role he resumed in his later years.

His voiceover work resumed in the '80s when he began providing the voiceover for Cadbury's Creme Eggs, which were advertised on television with Adams' catchy slogan, "Nobunny knows Easter better than him [the Cadbury Bunny]." Also in the '80s, Adams did voiceover TV commercials for Sherwin-Williams Paints, and radio commercials for the Salvation Army. In addition, Adams was the narrator for Kix commercials in the '90s and a few Dentyne and Swanson commercials. He was also the announcer for a 1992 WCBS-TV news promotion and a 1986 Lysol commercial.  In the early '90s, he narrated Frontiers of Flight, a Discovery Channel series on milestones of aviation.

During the 1970s, Adams was a co-star of the NBC soap opera Another World, and in 1976, he was in the original 1976 Broadway cast for Checking Out. Following that, he landed perhaps his most famous role, Managing Editor Charlie Hume in the television series Lou Grant, which aired from 1977 to 1982.  Appearing in the show for its entire run, he landed three straight Emmy Award nominations for Best Supporting Actor in 1979, 1980, and 1981, each year alongside his Lou Grant co-star Robert Walden, who played reporter Joe Rossi.  During his run on Lou Grant, Adams performed perhaps his most often-seen role, as the US president in Omen III: The Final Conflict (1981). He also appeared in popular TV movies, such as The Deadliest Season (1977), Revenge of the Stepford Wives (1980), and The Kid with the Broken Halo (1982).

In 1983, Adams joined The Mirror Theater Ltd's repertory company for their first season, appearing in Paradise Lost, Rain, Inheritors, and The Hasty Heart. This season was presented initially off-off-Broadway at the Real Stage Acting School, and was moved off-Broadway to the Theatre at St. Peter's Church. In 1986, he starred as Col. Edward Mason, one of his most famous feature-film roles, in the movie F/X starring Bryan Brown and Brian Dennehy, and in 1991, he appeared in the action movie Toy Soldiers.

In 1993, Adams starred as Walter Warner Sr., in the movie Son in Law starring Pauly Shore, and then had roles in Houseguest (1995), Touch (1997), and The Lesser Evil (1998). In the 1998 HBO miniseries From the Earth to the Moon, he played Senator Clinton P. Anderson. His final role was in the series finale of Oz.

Radio career
Mason Adams played many characters in Old-Time Radio programs, among them:
 The Adventures of Ellery Queen
 The Adventures of Superman
 Big Sister
 Big Town
 CBS Radio Mystery Theater
 The Crime Club
 Exploring Tomorrow
 Gasoline Alley
 Grand Central Station
 Inner Sanctum
 The Mysterious Traveler
 The NBC Radio Theatre
 Nick Carter, Master Detective
 Pepper Young's Family
 Proudly We Hail
 Suspense
 This Is My Story
 X Minus One
 Yours Truly, Johnny Dollar
 Corporal Eddie on a series of public-announcement shows for the U.S. Army

Christmas recording
Adams played Mack in the episode "Miracle for Christmas" of the Grand Central Station radio series. In the story, Mack is an ambulance driver in a poor neighborhood, who drives an intern who turns out to be more than a doctor.  It was repeated for six years out of popularity, and is still considered a classic from the Radio Golden Era.

Adams achieved a bit of holiday immortality by taking part in a comedy spoof of "The Twelve Days of Christmas", called "The Chickens Are in the Chimes" (RCA Victor 74-8277, 1963). Recorded by Sascha Burland and the Skipjack Choir, with Adams as the lead voice, this recording was issued in 1963 on a 45 rpm record, but has never been released on compact disc. The recording for the "B" side was "Have Yourself a Merry Little Christmas". "The Chickens Are in the Chimes" has often been played over radio stations at Christmas, and became a holiday favorite ever since.

Personal life and death
Adams was the older brother of Dr. Herbert L. Abrams, a radiologist who helped to found International Physicians for the Prevention of Nuclear War, which was awarded the Nobel Peace Prize in 1985.

Adams married Margot Fineberg in 1958. The couple had a daughter, Betsy, and a son, Bill. Adams died on April 26, 2005, from natural causes.

Filmography

Film

Television

References

External links

 
Obituary in the Star Gazette

1919 births
2005 deaths
American male film actors
American male radio actors
American male television actors
American male voice actors
University of Wisconsin–Madison College of Letters and Science alumni
Male actors from New York City
People from Brooklyn
Townsend Harris High School alumni
20th-century American male actors
21st-century American male actors